En Vivo Desde el Teatro Alameda (English Live from Alameda Theatre) is the 12th album by Mexican pop singer Daniela Romo, this is her first and only live album to date. This album was released on 1998 and it was produced by Tina Galindo.

Track listing
Tracks[]:

Disc 1
 Una aventura
 Que sabes tú - Franqueza - Voy - Si Dios me quita la vida
 Quiero amanecer con alguien
 Amada mas que nunca
 Mulata
 Yo no te pido la luna - Quiero saber - Poesías - Ese momento
 Todo, todo, todo

Disc 2
 De mi enamórate
 Un mundo raro -Mía- Cien años- Dame un poco de ti - Cheque en blanco - Abuso
 Cuidado con los ladrones
 Mátame
 Que vengan los bomberos

1998 albums
Daniela Romo albums